Craig Snyder is an American writer, poet, and photographer. He is also a historian of skate and surf culture.

Life and career
Born and raised in South Florida, Snyder grew up skating with many of the skate stars that had laid the foundation for modern skateboarding including Alan Gelfand, Mike McGill, and Rodney Mullen. He also worked as a photographer and contributed to a number of skate magazines including SkateBoarder. Snyder's images have been published internationally by ESPN, Der Spiegel, TransWorld Skateboarding, and Concrete Wave, and appeared in a number of books, films, and exhibitions. From photography, Snyder expanded into poetry, writing, and art. He has collaborated with musicians from the United States, Canada, Europe, and Japan on various projects that include readings, performances and recordings.

Bibliography
Author
A Secret History of the Ollie,  Vol. 1: The 1970s (Black Salt Press, 2015)
Contributing Author
Surfing Florida: A Photographic History,  (University Press of Florida, 2014)
Contributing Photographer
Free Ride: Skateboard, mécanique galiléenne et formes simples,  (Éditions B42, Paris, 2011)

Discography
Collaborations
The Blue Void Trilogy: Horse Mood / Bruno Green (2004) Hasta Luego/La Grange á Disques (Rock)
Welcome to the Red Barn / Santa Cruz (2003) Hasta Luego (Rock)
Siki / Phat (2002) Blue Note (Jazz)

External links 
 Craig Snyder's website

American male poets
American non-fiction writers
American photojournalists
Year of birth missing (living people)
Living people
American male non-fiction writers
Skate photographers